Penicillium ochrochloron is a species of fungus in the genus Penicillium which produces penitrem A.

Further reading

References 

ochrochloron
Fungi described in 1923